The 2012 Symetra Tour (formerly the Futures Tour) was a series of professional women's golf tournaments held from March through September 2012 in the United States. It is the second-tier women's professional golf tour in the United States and the "official developmental tour" of the LPGA Tour. In 2012, its total prize money was $1,755,000.

Leading money winners
The top ten money winners at the end of the season gained fully exempt cards on the LPGA Tour for the 2013 season. In previous years, only the top five players received fully exempt cards while the next five receiving partial status.

Source

Schedule and results
The number in parentheses after winners' names show the player's total number of official money, individual event wins on the Symetra Tour including that event.

Source

Awards
Player of the Year, player who leads the money list at the end of the season
 Esther Choe
Gaëlle Truet Rookie of the Year Award, first year player with the highest finish on the official money list
 Mi Hyang Lee

Heather Wilbur Spirit Award, a player who "best exemplifies dedication, courage, perseverance, love of the game and spirit toward achieving goals as a professional golfer."
 Nicole Jeray

See also
2012 LPGA Tour
2012 in golf

References

External links

Symetra Tour
Symetra Tour